, also known by his nickname  and his hero name , is a superhero and one of the main protagonists of the manga series My Hero Academia, created by Kōhei Horikoshi. Overuse of the Quirk can potentially break his forearms.

As a child, Katsuki often bullied the Quirkless Izuku Midoriya. However, after they both entered U.A. High School and Katsuki lost to Izuku in training, he began to see him differently. After Katsuki is kidnapped by the League of Villains, All Might loses his Quirk in the process of saving him, which made him blame himself for All Might's retirement, though All Might later reassures him it was not his fault. Katsuki later becomes one of the only people who knows the true nature of Izuku's Quirk.

Katsuki has received positive reviews from critics, with many praising his character development throughout the series and his relationship with Izuku. The voice performances in both Japanese and English dub were also received praise. The character has also consistently ranked in the series' popularity polls, most commonly he placed first.

Creation and conception
In the first draft of the series, Katsuki was a genius with a nice personality, though Horikoshi scrapped this idea because it was too boring. Instead, he decided to make the character nasty and unlikeable. Horikoshi originally intended to keep Katsuki with the nasty and unlikable personality, though later decided to give him development so people wouldn't hate him. After the series' anime adaptation premiered, Horikoshi began writing the character with Nobuhiko Okamoto's voice in mind. Horikoshi had not expected Katsuki to become a popular character, so he was surprised to see the character rank well in the popularity polls.

Katsuki's English voice actor, Clifford Chapin, has commented that he often has to end recording sessions early due to his voice getting worn out from all the screaming the character does. Chapin prefers voice acting the more calmer and emotional scenes with the character, even making the character accidentally sound too vulnerable at times.

Appearances

In My Hero Academia
Katsuki begins the series as an intelligent student with aspirations of being the world's greatest hero, but had an arrogant, violent and crude personality. He often bullied Izuku Midoriya for being Quirkless during their childhood. However, after Izuku was given the generations-old Quirk One For All, he and Katsuki enter the prestigious U.A. High School and are both enrolled in Class 1-A. After losing to Izuku during their first training exercise, he begins to treat Izuku with a grudging respect, which eventually evolves into an ongoing rivalry. His attitude earned the ire from most of his classmates who would often scold, ignore or even taunt Katsuki. During the story, however, Katsuki receives character development on par with Izuku, learning the importance of teamwork and co-operation, becoming a leader, accepting help, and how to save others in order to win. He also begins developing a friendship with classmates Eijiro Kirishima and Shoto Todoroki. However, Katsuki still holds onto his habit of yelling. 

After being kidnapped by the League of Villains, and refusing their offer to join them, Katsuki is rescued by All Might, his childhood hero. However, All Might's hero career comes to an end as he uses the last of his powers in the fight against the mastermind and his arch-enemy, All For One, which fills Katsuki with guilt for being the one who was taken and putting an end to the hero. After failing the Provisional Hero Licensing Exam due to his guilt and aggressive attitude, Katsuki takes Izuku out to Testing Ground Gamma, and reveals he has finally put the pieces together on how Izuku received his Quirk, One For All, from All Might. After that, Katsuki challenges Izuku to a battle to deal with his guilt and ask why it was Izuku who was chosen to receive One For All, when they both grew up admiring All Might just as much as each other. After defeating Izuku, All Might arrives to stop the fight, reassures him that what happened was not his fault, and tells him the Origins of All For One, the injury that limited his hero work, his need for a successor, and All For One. After agreeing to keep this information secret, Katsuki becomes one of the few people to know the truth about One for All. As they return to the U.A. dorms, Katsuki promises Izuku that he will surpass him one day, to which Izuku responds that he will simply have to go even higher still than Katsuki, forming a proper rivalry between the two.

This rivalry becomes a quick rekindling of their childhood friendship and the pair talk more since the fight, although sometimes playfully antagonistic. As one of the only people who know Izuku's secret, Katsuki is often found training with Izuku to help him master his awakening Quirks and even sits in on his meetings with All Might about One For All. While gaining valuable lessons attending his internship with Izuku and Shoto, Katsuki's heart begins to open up more to people. However, the turning point for Katsuki's character happens during the war with the Paranormal Liberation Army. Katsuki watches on as Izuku, who has been giving his all to keep Tomura Shigaraki in the air, is about to die to Tomura's piercing attack. In a moment of pure urgency, Katsuki awakens a new explosive technique that propels him fast enough to push Izuku out of the way and tank the hits himself.

After Izuku left U.A. High School during the Dark Hero Arc, Katsuki and the rest of Class 1-A track down Izuku to bring him back to U.A. To convince Izuku into coming back, Katsuki apologizes to Izuku for bullying him in the past. He admits the reason he bullied Izuku was because of his jealousy from his own feeling that Izuku was closer to being a hero than he was and he also admitted that he had been taking his inferiority complex out on Izuku the entire time. He finishes by saying the words he had been wanting to say since they had both almost died: he was sorry for everything. Along with informing Izuku (which he says for the first time) that the latter's path wasn't ever misguided the moment he gained One for All, which he rightfully deserved.

Katsuki's Quirk is Explosion; it works by Katsuki sweating a nitroglycerin-like substance from his palms, which he can detonate at will. Throughout the series, Katsuki learns to apply this in different ways, such as to move through the air, create blinding flashes of light, catapult allies towards enemies, or create shockwaves to serve as defense. However, overuse makes his forearms ache.

In the series' anime adaptation, Katsuki is voiced by Nobuhiko Okamoto in Japanese and Clifford Chapin in English. In the stage play, he is portrayed by Ryōta Kobayashi.

Other media
Katsuki was added to the Jump Force video game as a DLC character in August 2019. In a crossover promotion with Avengers: Infinity War, Katsuki shared a brief conversation with Iron Man.

Katsuki also appears in Fortnite Battle Royale as one of the crossover characters along with Izuku Midoriya, Ochaco Uraraka and All Might.

Reception

Popularity
Katsuki has consistently ranked first in the series' popularity polls, beating out other popular characters such as Izuku Midoriya and Shoto Todoroki. In Tumblr's top anime and manga characters of 2020, Katsuki ranked second, behind only Izuku. Anime! Anime! did a poll where the readers voted for the most popular hero characters. Katsuki ranked as the fifth-most popular hero character in 2021; eighth in 2022; and seventh in 2023.

Critical response

Alex Osborn from IGN praised the character and his development throughout the series. Daniel Kurland from Den of Geek also praised the character; he also praised Chapin's English performance of the character. Sam Leach from Anime News Network praised the character as amazing; he also praised Okamoto's voice performance as the character. The reviewer for Anime UK News also offered praise for the character. The columnists for Manga News had similar feelings, praising the character and his development. Steven Blackburn from Screen Rant praised Katsuki's development throughout the series, though questioned some of the decisions made by the character in the later parts of the series. Chelsey Adams from Comic Book Resources felt that Katsuki became more likeable as the series progressed. Briana Lawrence from The Mary Sue praised Katsuki's character development and personality, calling the character relatable.

Actor Ryo Yoshizawa praised the character.

References

Anime and manga characters with superhuman strength
Child superheroes
Comics characters introduced in 2014
Fictional characters with disfigurements
Fictional characters with post-traumatic stress disorder
Fictional characters with fire or heat abilities
Fictional characters with superhuman durability or invulnerability
Fictional Japanese people in anime and manga
Fighting game characters
Japanese superheroes
Male characters in anime and manga
Male superheroes
My Hero Academia
Superheroes in anime and manga
Teenage characters in anime and manga
Teenage characters in television
Teenage superheroes
Superhero school students